Blackgang Chine is the oldest amusement park in the United Kingdom, having opened in 1843. Named after a now-destroyed chine (a coastal ravine) in the soft Cretaceous cliffs, it is about 6 miles from Ventnor at the southern tip of the Isle of Wight just below St Catherine's Down. Blackgang Chine and its sister park Robin Hill are owned by the Dabell family. Blackgang Chine is home to many lands of imagination, including Pirate Cove, Restricted Area 5, Fairy Land and Village, and Cowboy Town. Owing to the unstable land on which the park is situated, landslides occur frequently, meaning that attractions have been moved further inland to safer ground on several occasions.

History

During Blackgang Chine's early years, the area was a steep gaunt ravine, overlooking Chale Bay, stretching around three-quarters of a mile down to the shore. It was a quiet place, visited by few people other than local fishermen with rumours of a thriving smuggling trade, which has now become a key theme of the park. On 11 October 1836 the cargo ship Clarendon was wrecked at the foot of Blackgang Chine, with the loss of many aboard.

During Victorian times, people were seeking out new healthy holiday resorts, ideally near the coast. As the railway network was getting closer and closer to the south coast, the Isle of Wight was becoming an increasingly attractive holiday destination. Alexander Dabell, the founder of the park, soon realised the business potential of this, trying various ventures. In 1839 Alexander became friends with a publican who had recently built a hotel at Blackgang, which now forms the Chine Cafe (formerly Pirates' Pantry restaurant) and administration offices.
After studying the gault and chine gorge, he knew instantly that gardens could be set up that would appeal to the Victorians as a romantic holiday destination. This along with the increasing popularity of the adjacent Sandrock Spring (a chalybeate spring) led to Alexander concluding a lease for the site in 1842 and the establishment of Blackgang Chine amusement park in 1843. The area was then opened up to the public with pathways built down to the ravine and gardens landscaped on the cliffs. Steps were built to give access to the beach from the lower road. Since the park was opened, it has remained a family business, with the descendants of Alexander Dabell owning it ever since. The park's claim to have been established in 1843 would make it the oldest theme park in the United Kingdom. Its initial theme of a general-purpose scenic and curiosity park led to one of its most famous attractions, a large whale skeleton, which had been washed up near the coast of The Needles in 1842, and is still a showpiece today.

The chine today

Owing to continual landslides, the chine itself has been destroyed, and coastal erosion still has a significant impact on the area today. The park's focus now is themed entertainment for families with young children, lifesize animatronic dinosaurs being a noted feature. The same owners run a sister site, the Robin Hill countryside adventure park. Clifftop walks in and around the area give panoramic views of the English Channel and the south-western Isle of Wight coast.

According to a May 2000 talk to the Isle of Wight Postcard Club by the then director, Mr Simon Dabell, the etymology is simply "black pathway" (the original appearance of the chine), but the theme park understandably fosters the interpretation of a smuggling origin. Thus visitors to the park are greeted by a gigantic fibreglass statue of a smuggler between whose legs they could pass to enter.

The Blackgang Chine park is featured in the book Bollocks to Alton Towers, a humorous book concerned with "uncommonly British days out". It was chosen for its apparent eccentricity. Blackgang Chine is also featured in a documentary based on Bollocks to Alton Towers called Far From the Sodding Crowd. In a 2010 interview, star of the Harry Potter films Rupert Grint praised the park, stating that his family's favourite holiday was visiting the Isle of Wight, their favourite attraction being Blackgang Chine.

The park is frequently associated with ghosts, particularly related to smugglers, with several tales of sightings around the park. In 2008 a video was recorded, showing what appeared to be the apparition of a girl in a blue dress.

Geology

Sited below the village of Blackgang at the western end of the Undercliff, Blackgang Chine was, historically, a spectacular ravine (in 1800 a "steep gaunt ravine" descending 500 feet over about ).

The location is based on unstable terrain owing to the underlying Gault Clay strata, resulting in a succession of huge landslips giving the area a very rugged appearance akin to the better known Jurassic Coast. Currently the cliffs are eroding at a rate of about 3.5 metres per year, although this process is not gradual nor consistent. Continuing landslides and coastal erosion swept away the paths in the early 1900s, and have since obliterated the chine itself and repeatedly forced the park owners to move the clifftop facilities inland.

Park guide
The park covers over 40 acres of cliff-top gardens and themed 'lands', containing outdoor rides and walkthrough attractions, plus heritage exhibitions.  Below is a list of the attractions currently in operation at the park:

Former attractions

Accidents

 in summer 2022, Shipwrecked's hydraulic arm collapsed while the ride was in operation. The park was closed for the rest of the day and the ride was closed during investigations.

Latest developments

In 2010, a new section to the park opened; "Blackgang's Disappearing Village". This was produced in conjunction with the BBC programme Coast, and featured presenter Dick Strawbridge in its video exhibits. It told the story of the island's coast and illustrated the cliff falls and erosion that Blackgang suffered over the years. Approximately half of this exhibition was later removed and converted to the new Hall of Mirrors in 2016. The remaining portion includes the park's original 19-metre-long skeleton of a fin whale, and a simulator designed to mimic the experience of the landslips which occurred at Blackgang.

In 2011, a 'Fairy Land' section was developed adjacent to the Fairy Castle. The following year, the pirate ship play area was redesigned as 'Pirate Cove', with two new pirate ships, and surrounded by other smaller themed buildings, a pirate shooting gallery, and 'The Sailors Return' (now 'The Vortex'), in which visitors walk through a spinning tunnel of lights designed to disorientate.

'Restricted Area 5' opened in 2014; a modernisation of the park's previous 'Dinosaurland'. It features new animatronic dinosaurs which move and roar when visitors approach. Some of the original fibreglass dinosaurs have been retained in the new walkthrough.

In 2015, Cowboy Town was remodelled, with new buildings and scenery. A family of animatronic Triceratops was also added to Restricted Area 5. This replaced the 'Mouth of Hell', a giant devilish 'mouth' that visitors could climb into.

In 2016, The Triassic Club attraction was removed, and the area was redeveloped as a new, larger space for 'The Mouth of Hell', which is now encircled by a new walkway themed with fallen angel statues and demonic sounds.

For the opening of the 2017 'Underwater Kingdom' attraction, the Fantasyland area of the park was completely redeveloped, resulting in the removal of 'The Weather Wizard', 'The Angry Dragon' and 'The Licorice Factory' attractions. The animated 'Smugglers Cave' walkthrough was also removed and a new similar structure was built in its place to form the entrance to the 'Underwater Kingdom'.

As of 2018 and after 56 years, the Water Gardens are no longer part of the park. Demolition of the area began in 2016, with the last of the three remaining ponds nearest the cliff edge being filled in during the winter of 2017.

For the park’s 2022 season, two new rides were opened; a drop ride called ‘Evolution’ and a rotating boat ride named ‘Shipwrecked’.

References

External links

 Old pictures of Blackgang Chine

Amusement parks in England
Chines of the Isle of Wight
Tourist attractions on the Isle of Wight
Museums on the Isle of Wight
Forestry museums
History of forestry
1843 establishments in England
Amusement parks opened in 1843